University Heights Hospital was a proprietary hospital located in the 18th Electoral District (ED) of The Bronx. This private hospital served its local community for births  and deaths but was more limited in-between.

They were included in a study of patient racial composition published in 1984. The hospital closed, and the site was repurposed as a store.

References

  

Defunct hospitals in the Bronx
History of the Bronx